Homelix is a genus of longhorn beetles of the subfamily Lamiinae, containing the following species:

subgenus Homelix
 Homelix annuligera Aurivillius, 1914
 Homelix arcuata (Chevrolat, 1855)
 Homelix cribratipennis Thomson, 1858
 Homelix cruciata Breuning, 1937
 Homelix liturata (Quedenfeldt, 1882)
 Homelix morini Téocchi, 1999
 Homelix variegata Jordan, 1894

subgenus Hypomelix
 Homelix albofasciata Thomson, 1858
 Homelix decussata (Chevrolat, 1856)

subgenus Monotylus
 Homelix klingi (Kolbe, 1893)
 Homelix vittata Aurivillius, 1914

References

Phrynetini